Mohammadiyeh Rural District is in the Central District of Ardakan County, Yazd province, Iran. At the National Census of 2006, its population was 3,085 in 794 households. There were 3,611 inhabitants in 1,067 households at the following census of 2011. At the most recent census of 2016, the population of the rural district was 5,261 in 1,270 households. The largest of its 121 villages was Torkabad, with 1,138 people.

References 

Ardakan County

Rural Districts of Yazd Province

Populated places in Yazd Province

Populated places in Ardakan County